Hag: The Best of Merle Haggard is a compilation album by American country singer Merle Haggard, released in 2006.

Critical reception

Thom Jurek of AllMusic stated that the album "may be the best single-disc representation of the man's music out there", calling the sound and the package "phenomenal" and concluding, "This is sure to turn anyone who is curious into a Haggard fan. And for those who have everything, this is just a killer mix." Stephen M. Deusner of Pitchfork said that it's a good introduction for those who are new to Haggard's work.

Track listing

Personnel
 Merle Haggard – vocals, guitar

The Strangers
 Roy Nichols – lead guitar
 Norman Hamlet – steel guitar
 Tiny Moore – mandolin, fiddle
 Eldon Shamblin – guitar
 Ralph Mooney – steel guitar
 Gene Price – bass
 Gordon Terry – fiddle
 Bonnie Owens – vocals
 Ronnie Reno – guitar
 Bobby Wayne – guitar
 Marcia Nichols – guitar
 Clint Strong – guitar
 Mark Yeary – piano
 George French – piano
 Dennis Hromek – bass
 James Tittle – bass
 Johnny Meeks – bass
 Jerry Ward – bass
 Wayne Durham – bass
 Biff Adam – drums
 Eddie Burris – drums
 Don Markham – saxophone
 Jimmy Belkin – fiddle
 Gary Church – horns

References

2006 compilation albums
Merle Haggard compilation albums
Capitol Records compilation albums